The General Electric TF34 is an American military turbofan engine used on the A-10 Thunderbolt II and S-3 Viking.

Design and development
Developed by GE Aircraft Engines during the late 1960s, the original engine comprises a single stage fan, driven by a 4-stage low pressure (LP) turbine, supercharging a 14-stage high pressure (HP) compressor, driven by a 2-stage HP turbine. An annular combustor is featured. The TF34-GE-400A is rated at 9,275 lbf (41.26 kN) static thrust.

The civilian variant, the CF34, is used on a number of business and regional jets.

Variants
TF34-GE-2
Initial variant for Lockheed S-3, entered production in August 1972.
TF34-GE-100
Variant for Fairchild A-10A, first flown in A-10 during May 1972. Production began in October 1974.
TF34-GE-400A
Improved version of GE-2 for Lockheed S-3.

Applications

 Fairchild Republic A-10 Thunderbolt II 
 Lockheed S-3 Viking
 Lockheed Martin RQ-170 Sentinel
 Sikorsky S-72

Specifications (TF34-GE-400A)

See also

References

 Taylor, John W.R. Jane's All the World's Aircraft 1982-83., London, Jane's Publishing Company Ltd, 1982. .

External links

 General Electric TF34 page

TF34
High-bypass turbofan engines
1960s turbofan engines